John Vincent (fl. 1413–1416) of Sutton, Sussex, was an English politician.

He was a Member (MP) of the Parliament of England for Midhurst in May 1413 and for Chichester in March 1416.

References

14th-century births
15th-century deaths
English MPs May 1413
People from Chichester
English MPs March 1416